Maine School Administrative District 49 (MSAD 49) is an operating school district within Maine, covering the towns of Albion, Benton, Clinton and Fairfield.

References 

49
49
49